David Seymour (died 1557/58) was the member of the Parliament of England for Wareham for the parliament of 1547, and for Great Bedwyn for the parliament of 1555.

References

External links 

Members of the Parliament of England for Great Bedwyn
Members of the Parliament of England (pre-1707) for Wareham
1550s deaths
Year of birth uncertain
Year of death uncertain
English MPs 1547–1552
English MPs 1555